
Year 415 (CDXV) was a common year starting on Friday (link will display the full calendar) of the Julian calendar. At the time, it was known as the Year of the Consulship of Honorius and Theodosius (or, less frequently, year 1168 Ab urbe condita). The denomination 415 for this year has been used since the early medieval period, when the Anno Domini calendar era became the prevalent method in Europe for naming years.

Events 
 By place 

 Roman Empire 

 Constantius, Roman general (magister militum), drives the Visigoths out of Gaul. He captures the usurper Priscus Attalus, and sends him under military escort to Ravenna.
 The Visigoths invade the Iberian Peninsula and begin to conquer territory taken previously by the Vandals. King Ataulf and his pregnant wife Galla Placidia leave Gallia Narbonensis; they relocate at Barcelona. Their infant son, Theodosius, dies in infancy, eliminating an opportunity for a Roman-Visigothic line. Ataulf is assassinated in the palace while taking a bath. Sigeric succeeds him, but after a reign of seven days he is also murdered. 
 Autumn – Wallia, brother of Ataulf, becomes king of the Visigoths. He accepts a peace treaty with emperor Honorius, in return for a supply of 600,000 measures of grain. After the negotiations he sends Placidia to Rome with hostages.

 Asia 

 March 18 – The Daysan River floods Edessa (Mesopotamia).

 By topic 

 Religion 
 Hypatia of Alexandria, Neoplatonist philosopher, is murdered by a Christian mob of Nitrian monks at the church (former temple conceived by Cleopatra VII) called Caesareum.
 Having driven out the Jews, Alexandria's new patriarch, Cyril, has instigated the mob after taking offense at Hypatia's scientific rationalism (approximate date).
 John Cassian, Christian theologian, settles at a monastery in Marseille (Gaul); he organizes monastic communities after an eastern model. 
 The Eustathian schism in Antioch is healed (approximate date).

Births 
 Euric, king of the Visigoths (d. 484)
 Tonantius Ferreolus, prefect of Gaul (approximate date)

Deaths 
 Athaulf, king of the Visigoths
 Chandragupta II, emperor of the Gupta Empire (India)
 Hypatia of Alexandria, female Neoplatonist philosopher 
 Sigeric, king of the Visigoths
 Thermantia, Roman empress
 Tufa Rutan, prince of the Southern Liang (b. 365)

References